Anthony John Tipper (born 16 September 1944) is a retired English speed skater. He competed at the 1968 Winter Olympics in the 500 m and 1500 m events and finished in 19th and 28th place, respectively.

Personal bests 
 500 m – 40.53 (1972)
 1000 m – 1:22.8 (1972)
 1500 m – 2:08.4 (1970)
 5000 m – 8:09.1 (1970)

References

External links
 

1944 births
Speed skaters at the 1968 Winter Olympics
Olympic speed skaters of Great Britain
People from Buckingham
Living people
English male speed skaters